Washoe County is a county in the U.S. state of Nevada. As of the 2020 census, the population was 486,492, making it Nevada's second-most populous county. Its county seat is Reno. Washoe County is included in the Reno, NV Metropolitan Statistical Area.

History
Washoe County was created on November 25, 1861, as one of the original nine counties of the Nevada Territory. It is named after the Washoe people who originally inhabited the area. It was consolidated with Roop County in 1864. Washoe City was the first county seat in 1861 and was replaced by Reno in 1871.

In 1911, a small band of Shoshone and Bannock led by Mike Daggett killed four stockmen in Washoe County. A posse was formed, and on February 26, 1911, at the Battle of Kelley Creek,  eight of Daggett's band were killed, along with one member of the posse, Ed Hogle. Three children and a woman who survived the battle were captured. The remains of some of the members of the band were repatriated from the Smithsonian Institution to the Fort Hall Idaho Shoshone-Bannock Tribe in 1994.

In 1918, Washoe County elected the first woman elected to the Nevada Legislature, Sadie Hurst, a Republican.

As of 2013, "Washoe County is the first school district in the state to offer Paiute classes," offering an elective course in the Paiute language at Spanish Springs High School and North Valleys High School.

Geography
The highest point in Washoe County is Mount Rose at 10,785 ft (3,287 m), while the most topographically prominent peak is Virginia Peak.

There are two incorporated cities within the county, namely Reno and Sparks. In 2010, there was a ballot question asking whether the Reno city government and the Washoe County government should become one combined governmental body. According to unofficial results the day after the election, 54% of voters approved of the ballot measure to consolidate the governments.

The Truckee Meadows of Washoe County starts at the furthest southern runway of Reno Tahoe International Airport, GPS Coordinates 39.468836,-119.770912 and runs south east. Rattle Snake Mountain at Huffaker Park, follows the span of Steamboat Creek to the southern east end of Washoe County.  This is the last of the range/prairie and wild grass water shed from the eastern range of the Reno Tahoe basin.

Adjacent counties

 Lake County, Oregon – north
 Harney County, Oregon – northeast
 Humboldt County – east
 Pershing County – east
 Churchill County – east
 Lyon County – southeast
 Storey County – south
 Carson City – south
 Placer County, California – southwest
 Nevada County, California – west
 Sierra County, California – west
 Lassen County, California – west
 Modoc County, California – west

Major highways

 
  Interstate 80 Business (Verdi)
  Interstate 80 Business (Reno–Sparks)
  Interstate 80 Business (Wadsworth–Fernley)
 
  U.S. Route 395
  U.S. Route 395 Alternate
  U.S. Route 395 Business (Reno)

National protected areas
 Anaho Island National Wildlife Refuge
 Black Rock Desert-High Rock Canyon Emigrant Trails National Conservation Area (part)
 Sheldon National Wildlife Refuge (part)
 Toiyabe National Forest (part)

Demographics

2000 census
As of the census of 2000, there were 339,486 people, 132,084 households, and 83,741 families living in the county.  The population density was 54 people per square mile (21/km2).  There were 143,908 housing units at an average density of 23 per square mile (9/km2).  The racial makeup of the county was 80.4% White, 2.1% Black or African American, 1.8% Native American, 4.3% Asian, 0.5% Pacific Islander, 7.7% from other races, and 3.3% from two or more races.  16.6% of the population were Hispanic or Latino of any race.

There were 132,084 households, out of which 31.1% had children under the age of 18 living with them, 47.9% were married couples living together, 10.30% had a female householder with no husband present, and 36.60% were non-families. 27.0% of all households were made up of individuals, and 7.7% had someone living alone who was 65 years of age or older.  The average household size was 2.53 and the average family size was 3.09.

In the county, the population was spread out, with 24.9% under the age of 18, 9.8% from 18 to 24, 31.0% from 25 to 44, 23.8% from 45 to 64, and 10.5% who were 65 years of age or older.  The median age was 36 years. For every 100 females, there were 102.8 males.  For every 100 females age 18 and over, there were 101.8 males.

The median income for a household in the county was $45,815, and the median income for a family was $54,283. Males had a median income of $36,226 versus $27,953 for females. The per capita income for the county was $24,277.  About 6.7% of families and 10.0% of the population were below the poverty line, including 12.2% of those under age 18 and 6.2% of those age 65 or over.

2010 census
As of the 2010 United States Census, there were 421,407 people, 163,445 households, and 102,768 families living in the county. The racial makeup of the county was 76.9% white, 5.2% Asian, 2.3% black or African American, 1.7% American Indian, 0.6% Pacific islander, 9.5% from other races, and 3.8% from two or more races. Those of Hispanic or Latino origin made up 22.2% of the population. In terms of ancestry, 16.9% were German, 13.1% were Irish, 11.8% were English, 7.2% were Italian, and 4.7% were American.

Of the 163,445 households, 32.0% had children under the age of 18 living with them, 45.6% were married couples living together, 11.3% had a female householder with no husband present, 37.1% were non-families, and 27.2% of all households were made up of individuals. The average household size was 2.55 and the average family size was 3.11. The median age was 37.0 years.

The median income for a household in the county was $55,658 and the median income for a family was $67,428. Males had a median income of $46,653 versus $35,559 for females. The per capita income for the county was $29,687. About 8.5% of families and 12.6% of the population were below the poverty line, including 17.0% of those under age 18 and 6.4% of those age 65 or over.

2016
The Demographics of Washoe County covers 6,540.4 square miles. There are approximately 42,154 households in the unincorporated areas with an estimated population of 419,948. The average household size in 2007 was estimated at 2.70. The Truckee Meadows Fire Protection District is charged with fire protection and emergency services in the unincorporated areas of the county.

Politics
Washoe County was a Republican stronghold throughout the late twentieth century, having only voted for the Democratic candidate once between 1944 and 2004 (in the 1964 Democratic landslide). Since the 1990s, it has become more competitive, going from a 22-point win for George H. W. Bush in 1988 to only a three-point win for Bush in 1992. From 1996 to 2004, the Republican candidate tallied a margin greater than four points. Barack Obama won it by a 12-point margin in 2008, and since then, it has always voted Democratic in presidential elections, albeit by relatively narrow margins. However, Republicans still hold the majority of the county's seats in the state legislature. Democratic strength is concentrated in Reno and Sparks, while the rest of the county is much more Republican.

The county is governed by an elected five-member Board of County Commissioners and an appointed county manager. The commissioners serve staggered four-year terms - three are elected during midterm elections and two during presidential elections. 

1) Appointed by Governor Jim Gibbons.

 Nevada Senate districts
 13th (central Reno and Sparks)
 14th (northern Washoe County)
 15th (Cold Springs, Mogul, Verdi)
 16th (Incline Village, Washoe Valley)

Communities

Cities
 Reno (county seat)
 Sparks

Census-designated places

 Cold Springs
 Crystal Bay
 Empire
 Gerlach
 Golden Valley
 Incline Village
 Lemmon Valley
 Mogul
 Nixon
 Spanish Springs
 Sun Valley
 Sutcliffe
 Verdi
 Wadsworth
 Washoe Valley

Other unincorporated communities and ghost towns
 Deep Hole
 Flanigan
 Galena
 New Washoe City
 Poeville
 Pleasant Valley
 Pyramid
 Steamboat Springs
 Vya
 Washoe City

Education
Washoe County School District is the school district for the entire county.

The Bureau of Indian Education-contracted Pyramid Lake Schools is in Nixon.

There is a charter school, Coral Academy of Science; and these private schools: Bishop Manogue High School and Excel Christian School.

University of Nevada, Reno is in Reno.

Washoe County Library System is the public library system.

Notable Residents
Jeremy Renner - Hollywood Actor

See also

 National Register of Historic Places listings in Washoe County, Nevada
 Reno 911!, a parody cop show set in Washoe County
 Washoe Zephyr, a regional wind referenced by Mark Twain.

References

External links

 
 Historical Markers of Washoe County

 
1861 establishments in Nevada Territory
Nevada placenames of Native American origin
Reno, NV Metropolitan Statistical Area
Populated places established in 1861